Anthony O'Sullivan (born 24 November 1966) is an Irish retired hurler who played for Cork Championship club Bishopstown. He played for the Cork senior hurling team for one season, during which time he usually lined out as a right wing-forward.

Honours

University College Cork
Fitzgibbon Cup (2): 1988, 1990

Bishopstown
Cork Intermediate Hurling Championship (1): 1992

Cork
All-Ireland Senior Hurling Championship (1): 1990
Munster Senior Hurling Championship (1): 1990

References

1966 births
Living people
Alumni of University College Cork
Bishopstown hurlers
UCC hurlers
Cork inter-county hurlers